Frank Loyer Pinckney (September 20, 1884 – June 11, 1945) was an American college basketball coach for the University of Illinois from 1906 to 1907.  Pinckney coached the Fighting Illini to a record of 1 win and 10 losses with the only win at the hands of the Peoria YMCA. He graduated from the University of Illinois with an Artium Baccalaureatus (A.B.) Degree in science.  After coaching the Illini, Pinckney moved to Dundee, Illinois, and taught manual training to high school students from 1910 to 1912.  After leaving Dundee, Pinckney joined the Illinois militia as a sergeant in with the 314 motor supply train in the American Expeditionary Forces serving in France.

Personal life
Pinckney was born in Pontiac, Illinois, on September 20, 1884. He was the son of Seymour V. Pinckney and Ida Mae Constible.  He married Rosa Wenzelmann and had a primary occupation of teacher for all of his adult life.  Pinckney died on June 11, 1945, in Proviso, Illinois, and is buried in South Side Cemetery in Pontiac, Illinois.

References

1884 births
1945 deaths
American men's basketball coaches
Basketball coaches from Illinois
College men's basketball head coaches in the United States
Illinois Fighting Illini football players
Illinois Fighting Illini men's basketball coaches
People from Pontiac, Illinois
People from West Dundee, Illinois
Sportspeople from Kane County, Illinois
United States Army personnel of World War I
United States Army soldiers